Dove Bay is a bay in King Frederick VIII Land, northeastern Greenland. It is part of the Northeast Greenland National Park area.

Etymology
Dove bay is said to have been the legendary Breidifjòrdr of the Sagas of Icelanders. 

It was named Dove Bai by the Second German North Polar Expedition led by Carl Koldewey after German physicist and meteorologist Heinrich Wilhelm Dove (1803–79).

Geography

Dove Bay is a large bay located between Cape Bismarck in Germania Land to the north, a complex cluster of coastal islands to the west, Store Koldewey to the east and Adolf S. Jensen Land to the southwest. Besides Store Koldewey, there are numerous islands in the periphery of the bay such as Edward Island, Godfred Hansen Island, Lindhard Island, Nanok Island, Tvillingerne and Djævleøen —with its conspicuous Teufelkap. There are also fjords, such as the Mørkefjord and Hellefjord, having their mouth in the bay. To the south, the bay opens to the Greenland Sea through the Storebaelt (Store Bælt) strait.

The bay is usually free from ice in August and September. Its waters are deep.

The Danmarkshavn weather station is located north of the bay on the southern shore of the Germania Land Peninsula.

References

External links

Bays of Greenland